Jean Troillet (born 10 March 1948) is a professional mountain climber.

Of Swiss and Canadian nationality, he obtained his mountain guide qualifications in 1969. Also in 1969, and at the age of 21, he set a speed record for an ascent of the Matterhorn of four hours and ten minutes. He has climbed ten peaks of more than 8000 metres, all in alpine style and without oxygen.

Troillet climbed Everest in 1986. In 1997 he was the first man to descend from the roof of the world on a snowboard, although he did not ride down from the top.

Mountain guide, and seafarer, he was the shipmate of Laurent Bourgnon on board Primagaz.

Photographer for Animan and heli-skiing guide.

Together with Erhard Loretan, Troillet holds the speed record for the ascent of Everest by the North Face, that is, 43 hours to the summit and back.

The 8000-metre peaks of Jean Troillet 

K2, 8611 m
Dhaulagiri, 8167 m
Everest, 8848 m
Cho Oyu, 8201 m
Shisha Pangma, 8013 m
Makalu, 8463 m
Lhotse, 8516 m
Kangchenjunga, 8586 m
Gasherbrum I, 8068 m
Gasherbrum II, 8035 m

See also
List of 20th-century summiters of Mount Everest

References

External links
Official web site

1948 births
Living people
Swiss mountain climbers
Swiss summiters of Mount Everest
People from Entremont district
Sportspeople from Valais